Fox Lake is a natural lake in South Dakota, in the United States.

Fox Lake has the name of John Fox, a pioneer settler.

See also
List of lakes in South Dakota

References

Lakes of South Dakota
Bodies of water of Beadle County, South Dakota